Raghavendra P. Tiwari is the Vice Chancellor of Central University of Punjab, Bathinda. He has also served as the Vice-Chancellor in Dr. Hari Singh Gour University, Sagar M.P.

Education
He completed his graduation from A.P.S. University, Rewa, M.P. and completed his PG degree in Applied Geology from Dr. Harisingh Gour Vishwavidyalaya, Sagar M.P. and Ph D degree in Palaeontology from Gauhati University. He is also specialized in GPS Geodesy and seismology. He is pioneered in palaeobiological and biostratigraphic researches in India. He has supervised 18 doctoral thesis and successfully completed ten major research projects funded by Ministry of Science & Technology and Ministry of Earth Sciences. He has published nearly 100 research papers in national and international journals. He has been in the editorial board of four national and international journals, and reviewer of five research journals. He has been a Member of the University Grants Commission and the Executive Council of NAAC, Bangalore.

Books
 .
 .

Career

He served for 32 years Mizoram University, in various capacities as the Head, Department of Geology, Dean of School of Studies for 13 years and Finance Officer (additional charge) besides serving as members of the Academic Council, Executive Council and the University Court, Member, Mizoram State Higher Education Council; Member, Governing Body and Research Advisory Council of Wadia Institute of Himalayan Geology, Dehradun; Member, Research Advisory Council of Birbal Sahni Institute of Palaeosciences (BSIP), Lucknow; Member, Exploration Research Advisory Committee of Atomic Mineral Division, North Eastern Region, Shillong and presently working as Professor (HAG) in Geology in Mizoram University. He has headed several committee of UGC, Ministry of Education and Ministry of Science & Technology, Govt. of India concerning higher education.

Awards
 L. Rama Rao Birth Centenary Award for significant contribution in Indian Stratigraphy & Palaeontology in 2012 by Geological Society of India, Bangalore.
 Dr. S. M. Naqvi Gold Medal Award for significant contribution in Indian Geology in 2014 by Geological Society of India, Bangalore.

References

1959 births
Living people
Gauhati University alumni
Academic staff of the Central University of Punjab
Academic staff of Mizoram University
Heads of universities and colleges in India
20th-century Indian educational theorists
21st-century Indian educational theorists
20th-century Indian educators
21st-century Indian educators
Date of birth missing (living people)
Place of birth missing (living people)